Tom Taylor (born 16 July 2001) is an English actor. He is known for his performance as Jake Chambers in The Dark Tower and Tom Foster in the BBC One hit drama Doctor Foster.

Life and career
Taylor was born on 16 July 2001. He is from Surrey. He stopped attending drama school in 2013 until his former teacher, Rachel Bell of The Secret Stage School in Camberley, told him an agent was coming to the school for interviews. Taylor went to audition, was signed with his first agent and went on to star in The Last Kingdom and Doctor Foster for the BBC.

Taylor won the role of Jake Chambers in The Dark Tower in March 2016, after a worldwide casting. He was set to reprise the role in a television series based on the fourth volume of The Dark Tower book series. However, the production of that TV series
will be a reboot with no connection to the film due to its financial and critical result.

Filmography

References

External links
 Tom Taylor on IMDb.

2001 births
Living people
21st-century English male actors
English male child actors
English male film actors
English male television actors
People from Surrey